This is a list of films based on French-language comics. It includes films that are adaptations of Francophone comics, and those films whose characters originated in those comics.

Films

Series with more than three entries
Based on Asterix:
 Asterix the Gaul (1967, Animation)
 Asterix and Cleopatra (1968, Animation)
 The Twelve Tasks of Asterix (1976, Animation)
 Asterix Versus Caesar (1985, Animation)
 Asterix in Britain (1986, Animation)
 Asterix and the Big Fight (1989, Animation)
 Asterix Conquers America (1994, Animation)
 Asterix & Obelix Take On Caesar (1999, Live-Action)
 Asterix & Obelix: Mission Cleopatra (2002, Live-Action)
 Asterix and the Vikings (2006, Animation)
 Astérix at the Olympic Games (2008, Live-Action)
 Asterix and Obelix: God Save Britannia (2012, Live-Action)
 Asterix: The Mansions of the Gods (2014, CGI Animation)
 Asterix: The Secret of the Magic Potion (2018, CGI Animation)
 Asterix & Obelix: The Middle Kingdom (2023, Live-Action)
Based on Lucky Luke:
  (1971, Live-action)
 Daisy Town (1971, Animation)
 La Ballade des Dalton (1978, Animation)
  (1983, Animation)
 Lucky Luke (1991, Live-action)
 Les Dalton (2004, Live-action)
 Go West! A Lucky Luke Adventure (2007, Animation)
 Lucky Luke (2009, Live-action)
Based on The Adventures of Tintin:
 The Crab with the Golden Claws (1947, Stop-motion Animation)
 Tintin and the Golden Fleece (1961, Live-action)
 Tintin and the Blue Oranges (1964, Live-action)
 Tintin and the Temple of the Sun (1969, Animation)
 Tintin and the Lake of Sharks (1972, Animation)
 The Adventures of Tintin: The Secret of the Unicorn (2011, Mo-cap Animation)
Based on The Smurfs:
 Les Aventures des Schtroumpfs (1965, Animation)
 The Smurfs and the Magic Flute (1976, Animation)
 The Smurfs (2011, Live-action/cgi)
 The Smurfs 2 (2013, Live-action/cgi)
 Smurfs: The Lost Village (2017, CGI Animation)
Based on L'Élève Ducobu:
 L'Élève Ducobu (2011; Live-Action)
  (2012; Live-Action)
  (2020; Live-Action)
  (2022; Live-Action)

Series with two to three entries
Based on Bécassine:
 Bécassine (1940; Live-Action)
  (2001; Animation)
 Bécassine (2018; Live-action)
Based on Les Pieds Nickelés:
 Les Aventures des Pieds-Nickelés (1948; Live-Action)
  (1950; Live-Action)
  (1964; Live-Action)
Based on Les Amoureux de Peynet:
 Si tous les amoureux du monde... (1963, Live-action)
 Around the World with Peynet's Lovers (1974, Animation)
Based on Les Aventures de la Famille Anatole:
 Street Without a King (1950; Live-action)
 Darling Anatole (1954; Live-action)
Based on Boule et Bill:
  (2013; Live-Action)
  (2017; Live-Action)
Based on Gaston:
  (1981; Live-Action)
  (2018; Live-Action)
Based on Joséphine:
Joséphine (2013; Live-Action)
Joséphine, Pregnant & Fabulous (2016; Live-Action)
Based on Largo Winch:
 Largo Winch (2008; Live-Action)
 Largo Winch II (2011; Live-Action)
Based on Les Profs:
 Serial Teachers (2013; Live-Action)
 Serial Teachers 2 (2015; Live-Action)
Based on Tamara:
 Tamara (2016; Live-Action)
 Tamara Vol. 2 (2018; Live-Action)
Based on :
 (2018; Live-action)
 (2022; Live-action)

One-shot films 
Based on :
 The Dance (1962; Live-action)
Based on L'Amour propre (ne le reste jamais très longtemps):
  (1985; Live-action)
Based on Les Amours célèbres:
 Famous Love Affairs (1961, Live-action)
Based on Au nom du fils:
 Au nom du fils (2015; Live-action)
Based on Aya of Yop City:
Aya of Yop City (2012; Animation)
Based on Barbarella:
 Barbarella (1968; Live-action)
Based on Benoît Brisefer:
  (2014; Live-action)
Based on Bibi Fricotin:
 Bibi Fricotin (1951; Live-action)
Based on :
  (1996; Live-action)
Based on :
  (2020; Live-action)
Based on Blue Is the Warmest Color:
Blue Is the Warmest Colour (2013; Live-action)
Based on Blue Pills:
  (2014; Live-action)
Based on Blueberry:
 Blueberry (2004; Live-action)
Based on Charly:
 L'Avion (2005; Live-action)
Based on Chicken with Plums:
Chicken with Plums (2011; Live-action)
Based on Les Cités obscures:
 Taxandria (1994, Live-action/cgi)
Based on Clémentine chérie:
  (1964; Live-action)
Based on Corps et âme:
 The Assignment (2016; Live-action)
Based on Couleur de peau: miel:
Approved for Adoption (2012; Animation)
Based on La Course du rat:
  (1980; Live-action)
Based on La Création du monde (Jean Effel):
  (1958; Animation)
Based on Le crime ne paie pas:
 Le Crime ne paie pas (1962; Live-action)
Based on Le démon de midi:
 The Demon Stirs (2005; Live-action)
Based on :
  (1975; Live-action)
Based on Dolorès:
  (2016; Live-action)
Based on Du plomb dans la tête:
 Bullet to the Head (2013; Live-action)
Based on The Extraordinary Adventures of Adèle Blanc-Sec:
 The Extraordinary Adventures of Adèle Blanc-Sec (2010; Live-action)
Based on :
 The Fenouillard Family (1961; Live-action)
Based on La Foire aux immortels:
 Immortal (2004; Mo-cap Animation)
Based on :
 The Big Bad Fox and Other Tales... (2017; Animation)
Based on Gros Dégueulasse:
 Gros Dégueulasse (1985; Live-action)
Based on La Guerre des Lulus:
 La Guerre des Lulus (2023; Live-action)
Based on :
  (2018; Animation)
Based on L'Invitation:
 L'Invitation (2016; Live-action)
Based on Iznogoud:
 Iznogoud (2005; Live-action)
Based on Jack Palmer:
The Corsican File (2004; Live-action)
Based on :
  (2002; Live-action)
Based on Jesuit Joe:
  (1991; Live-action)
Based on Jojo:
 Jojo: The Violet Mystery (2000; Animation)
Based on Junior:
  (1984; Live-action)
Based on The Little Vampire:
 Little Vampire (2020; Animation)
Based on Lou!:
 Lou! Journal infime (2014; Live-action)
Based on Lulu femme nue:
 Lulu femme nue (2013; Live-action)
Based on Lune de guerre:
  (2005; Live-action)
Based on Ma maman est en Amérique, elle a rencontré Buffalo Bill:
  (2013; Animation)
Based on Mam'zelle Souris:
 Mam'zelle Souris (1957; Live-action)
Based on Mars et Avril:
 Mars & Avril (2012, Live-action/cgi)
Based on the Marsupilami:
 HOUBA! On the Trail of the Marsupilami (2012; Live-action/cgi)
Based on Michel Vaillant:
 Michel Vaillant (2003; Live-action)
Based on La Mort de Staline:
 The Death of Stalin (2017; Live-action)
Based on :
 Mutafukaz (2017; Animation)
Based on Sandcastle:
Old (2021; Live-action)
Based on Une nuit de pleine lune:
The Owners (2020; Live-action)
Based on Ordinary Victories:
 (2015; Live-action)
Based on L'Outremangeur:
The Overeater (2012; Live-action)
Based on Paul:
 Paul à Québec (2015; Live-action)
Based on Paulette:
  (1986; Live-action)
Based on Pauvre Richard: 
  (2013; Live-action)
Based on Persepolis:
 Persepolis (2007; Animation)
Based on Les Petits Ruisseaux:
 Wandering Streams (2010; Live-action)
Based on Le Petit Spirou:
Le Petit Spirou (2017; Live-action)
Based on Polina:
 Polina (2016; Live-action)
Based on Quai d'Orsay:
 The French Minister (2013; Live-action)
Based on The Rabbi's Cat:
 The Rabbi's Cat (2011; Animation)
Based on Raoul Taburin Keeps a Secret:
  (2019; Live-action)
Based on Rosalie Blum:
Rosalie Blum (2016; Live-action)
Based on Seuls:
Seuls (2017; Live-action)
Based on :
Falcon Lake (2022; Live-action)
Based on :
 P'tit Con (1984; Live-action)
Based on Spirou et Fantasio:
 Les Aventures de Spirou et Fantasio (2018; Live-action)
Based on Tanguy et Laverdure:
 Sky Fighters (2005; Live-action)
Based on La Tête dans le sac:
  (1984; Live-action)
Based on Titeuf:
 Titeuf (2011; CGI Animation)
Based on :
 Slices of Life (1985; Live-action)
Based on Le Transperceneige:
 Snowpiercer (2014; Live-action/cgi)
Based on Valérian and Laureline:
 Valerian and the City of a Thousand Planets (2017; Live-action/cgi)
Based on Vive les femmes!:
  (1984; Live-action)
Based on Women Have Only One Thing on Their Minds:
 Elles ne pensent qu'à ça... (1994; Live-action)
Based on XIII:
 XIII: The Conspiracy (2008; Live-action TV film)
Based on Yakari:
 Yakari, A Spectacular Journey (2020; Animation)
Based on Zai zai zai zai:
  (2022)
Based on :
 Zombillenium (2017; Animation)

See also
 List of films based on English-language comics
 List of films based on manga

Also related:
 List of TV series based on French-language comics
 List of films based on comic strips
 List of fiction works made into feature films
 List of comic-based films directed by women
List of Franco-Belgian comics series

References

External links
Superheroes Lives - Internationals

Bandes dessinées
French-language comics